Leonard Hawkes FRS (6 August 1891 – 29 October 1981) was a British geologist. Awarded the Murchison Medal in 1946 and the Wollaston Medal in 1962. He was head of the geology department at Bedford College, London between 1921 and 1956.

References

1891 births
1981 deaths
20th-century British geologists
Wollaston Medal winners
Fellows of the Royal Society